The rivière des Saults (in English: Saults river) is a tributary on the south bank of the Nicolet Southwest River. It empties into the municipality of Saint-Cyrille-de-Wendover, Notre-Dame-du-Bon-Conseil and Sainte-Brigitte-des-Saults, in the Drummond Regional County Municipality (MRC), in the administrative region of Centre-du-Québec, in Quebec, in Canada.

Except for the first  and near the mouth (village), the course of the river pass mainly in agricultural zone.

Geography 

The "rivière des Saults" has its source at the confluence of the north and south branches, in the Eastern part of the territory of the municipality of Saint-Cyrille-de-Wendover.

  toward northwest in agricultural zone of Saint-Cyrille-de-Wendover, crossing the route 255, then curving to the west, passing under the bridge of the railway, crossing the route 122, up to autoroute 20;

The "rivière des Saults" empties on the south bank (in a river elbows) of the Nicolet Southwest River, in the village of Sainte-Brigitte-des-Saults.

Toponymy 
The toponym "rivière des Saults" was formalized on December 5, 1968, at the Commission de toponymie du Québec.

See also 

 List of rivers of Quebec

References 

Rivers of Centre-du-Québec
Drummond Regional County Municipality